Ding Xuexiang (born 13 September 1962) is a Chinese politician who is currently the first vice premier of the People's Republic of China and the sixth-ranked member of the Politburo Standing Committee of the Chinese Communist Party.

Considered a close confidant of CCP general secretary Xi Jinping, Ding served on Xi's staff beginning in Shanghai, then followed him to Beijing. He served as the director of the General Office of the CCP between 2017 and 2023. He was also a member of the 19th Party Politburo, and a Secretary of the Party Secretariat between 2017 and 2022.

Early life and education 
Ding Xuexiang was born in Nantong, Jiangsu province, on 13 September 1962. He graduated from the Northeast Heavy Machinery Institute in Qinghuangdao, later renamed Yanshan University, in 1982 with a degree in engineering. Ding Xuexiang got his first job at the Shanghai Research Institute of Materials (SRIM) from 1982 to 1999, and joined the Chinese Communist Party in 1984. Ding Xuexiang received a master's degree in public administration from Fudan University's School of Management in 1993. At the Shanghai Research Institute of Materials, Ding advanced rapidly through various research, administrative, and party positions.

Political career 
Ding's rise to the Politburo was achieved primarily by climbing the ranks of the party. Ding moved into politics after obtaining his first cadre position, as the Deputy Director of the Shanghai Municipal Science & Technology Commission, in 1999. Throughout his tenure at the SRIM, he attained leadership roles in propaganda, organization, general office, politics, and legal affairs, gaining valuable experience in all said fields. He moved up the ranks of the party apparatus in Shanghai, finishing off his time in the city as Secretary of the Political and Legal Committee of the Shanghai Municipal Party Committee in 2013. He would first be elected to the Central Committee as an alternate member at the 18th Party Congress in 2012.

Politburo and Secretariat 
Ding joined the Politburo and the Secretariat of the CCP in October 2017, as the director of the CCP General Office, and remained his post of the CCP General Secretary's office director (chief of staff).

Politburo Standing Committee 
Following the first plenary session of the 20th CCP Central Committee in October 2022, Ding was elevated to the CCP Politburo Standing Committee, the top decision-making body in China. Ding also succeeded Han Zheng as the first vice premier of China in March 2023.

References 

 

Fudan University alumni
Politicians from Nantong
Living people
People's Republic of China politicians from Jiangsu
Chinese Communist Party politicians from Jiangsu
Alternate members of the 18th Central Committee of the Chinese Communist Party
Members of the Secretariat of the Chinese Communist Party
Members of the 19th Politburo of the Chinese Communist Party
Members of the 20th Politburo Standing Committee of the Chinese Communist Party
1962 births
Directors of the General Office of the Chinese Communist Party